Georg Agrikola (born 11 January 1959) is a German rower. He competed at the 1984 Summer Olympics and the 1988 Summer Olympics.

References

External links
 

1959 births
Living people
German male rowers
Olympic rowers of West Germany
Rowers at the 1984 Summer Olympics
Rowers at the 1988 Summer Olympics
People from Landau
Sportspeople from Rhineland-Palatinate